Rosalia Wu (born 28 May 1974) is a Taiwanese politician. Elected to the Taipei City Council in 2006, she served until 2016, when she won election to the Legislative Yuan.

Education
Wu was born in Taipei County on 28 May 1974. She is a graduate of Fu Jen Catholic University, where she studied Spanish and Japanese, before pursuing a master's of arts within National Taiwan University's Institute of Political Science.

Political career
Wu is affiliated with the former New Tide faction of the Democratic Progressive Party. She was elected to the DPP's Central Standing Committee in 2012.

Wu was elected to the Taipei City Council three times, in 2006, 2010, and 2014. For a portion of her time on the city council, Wu served as the DPP's caucus whip. While on the council, she showed an interest in environmental and infrastructure issues. In 2009, after a televised advertisement had been taken off the air due to a violation of the Satellite Radio and Television Act, Wu worked to remove a printed equivalent from the sides of Taipei buses. She sought to reopen the Zhongshan Soccer Stadium for its intended use after the 2010 Taipei International Flora Exposition, but did not succeed.

During the 2016 legislative elections, Wu defeated Chen Hsi-yu in an interparty primary. She was named the sole Pan-Green Coalition candidate for Taipei 1st district, and won election to the legislature by joining an electoral coalition of seven others, including Freddy Lim and Pasuya Yao. Wu defeated the district's incumbent representative, Ting Shou-chung, winning 95,000 votes. As a legislator, she has focused her attention on academia and education in Taiwan. Wu is opposed to corporal punishment in schools, and to education minister Wu Se-hwa's proposed senior high school curriculum changes, which were implemented despite a student protest. She spoke out against a 2016 proposal to merge Tainan National University of the Arts and National Cheng Kung University, stating, "I am against amalgamation for the sake of amalgamation." In March 2017, Wu said that Fu Jen Catholic University College of Social Sciences dean Hsia Lin-ching did not do enough to investigate allegations of sexual assault, and berated university administration for giving Hsia a light penalty. Shortly after her comments, Fu Jen students went to the Legislative Yuan to meet Wu, who was not there.

References

1974 births
Living people
Taipei Members of the Legislative Yuan
Members of the 9th Legislative Yuan
Democratic Progressive Party Members of the Legislative Yuan
21st-century Taiwanese women politicians
Fu Jen Catholic University alumni
Taipei City Councilors
Members of the 10th Legislative Yuan
Women local politicians in Taiwan
National Taiwan University alumni